Ken Stone may refer to:

 Ken Stone (American football) (born 1950), former professional American football safety
 Ken Stone (biblical scholar), author and biblical scholar
 Ken Stone (fighter) (born 1982), American mixed martial artist